Seyed Khorasani, is an Islamic leader whose rising is an essential part of Islamic eschatology. According to Al-Fadl ibn Shadhan of Neyshabur, in an authentic document from Imam Ja'far al-Sadiq, al-Khorasani is one of the townspeople of Samarkand, and he is considered to be amongst the assistants of the Mahdi.

Rising 
According to the hadith(s), Al-Khorasani has a spot on his right hand. It is predicted that he will to move to Kufah with Sufyani at one common day, and then defeat the Sufyani's army with his own army.

His rising is predicted to be commenced from the east of the Earth. With regards to al-Khorasani, ahadith was narrated from the Islamic prophet Muhammad saying:

It is predicted that after defeating the Sufyani's army in Iraq, al-Khorasani will swear allegiance to al-Mahdi.

The Black Standard 
The rising of al-Khorasani, or the movement of the Black Standard from the side of Khorasan, is considered to be among the signs of the appearance of the Mahdi.

Imam as-Sadiq was reported saying:

It has been mentioned in the traditions (hadiths) that "you ought to have the expectation of Faraj from three things":
 Establishment of differences between the ones who are from Shaam, for the things which is between them;
 Fear/bewilderment in the month of Ramadan.
 Movement of black flags from Khorasan.

Khorasan can relate to two places:
 A part of the current country of Iran which starts from the [Zagros Mountains]], towards Herat in present-day Afghanistan
 The areas around Khorasan, which its rulers had ruled.

See also 

 The Occultation
 Khasf al-Bayda'
 Shu'ayb bin Salih
 The voice from sky
 Reappearance of al-Mahdi
 Nafs-e-Zakiyyah (Pure soul)
 The signed letter of Muhammad al-Mahdi (Tawqee)

References 

Shia eschatology
Shia imams
Religious leadership roles
Islamic terminology
Shia Islam 
Islamic eschatology 
Mahdism